Changchun Foreign Languages School() is a Chinese high school founded in 1963. It is one of the 7 Foreign Language Schools founded during 1963-1964 under Premier Zhou Enlai's supervision.

The school has received Ministry of Education approval as an international school to popularize Chinese language. There are 3500 students in the school who are provided with different language classes such as English, Japanese, Russian, French, German and Spanish.

Foreign-language high schools in China
High schools in Jilin
Educational institutions established in 1963
1963 establishments in China